Bliss Torn from Emptiness is the fifth full-length album by drone doom band Nadja, first released on June 15, 2005 by Fargone Records. This album consists of one 48 minute instrumental track, also this edition of the album was limited to only 60 copies.

The album was later remastered and rereleased by Profound Lore Records, this version of the album was released on January 29, 2008, and has been slightly extended to 53 minutes and split into 3 parts that fade into one another and maintain the intent of the album being one long song.

Track list

Original edition

2008 reissue

Personnel

Aidan Baker - guitar, drum machine
Leah Buckareff - bass

External links
2008 edition of "Bliss Torn from Emptiness"
2005 edition of "Bliss Torn from Emptiness"

2005 albums
Nadja (band) albums
Profound Lore Records albums